This is a list of presidents of the Saint-Jean-Baptiste Society of Montreal.

19th century

First half 
1834: Jacques Viger (1st)
1835: Honorable Denis-Benjamin Viger (2nd)
1845: Honorable Joseph Masson (3rd)
1846-47: Honorable Augustin-Norbert Morin (4th)
1848-49: Honorable Joseph Bourret (5th)

Second half 
1850: Édouard-Raymond Fabre (6th)
1851-52: Ludger Duvernay (7th)
1852-53: Côme-Séraphin Cherrier, c.r. (8th)
1854-55: Sir George-Étienne Cartier (9th)
1856: Jacques Viger (1st)
1857: Dr. Jean-Baptiste Meilleur (10th)
1858: Damase Masson (11th)
1859: Dr. Pierre Beaubien (12th)
1860: Honourable Frédéric-Auguste Quesnel (13th)
1861: Romuald Trudeau (14th)
1862: Honourable Georges-René Saveuse de Beaujeu (15th)
1863: Honourable Antoine-Olivier Berthelet (16th)
1864: Louis-Tancrède Bouthillier (17th)
1865-66: Honourable Pierre-Jean-Olivier Chauveau (18th)
1867-68: Charles-André Leblanc, c.r. (19th)
1869-70: Honourable Gédéon Ouimet (20th)
1871: Honourable Charles-Séraphin Rodier (21st)
1872-74: Honourable Charles-Joseph Coursol (22nd)
1874: Sir Antoine-Aimé Dorion (23rd)
1875: Jacques Grenier (24th)
1876: Louis Archambeault (25th)
1877: Dr. Jean-Philippe Rottot (26th)
1879: Honourable Jean-Baptiste Rolland (27th)
1880: Honourable Thomas Jean-Jacques Loranger (28th)
1881: Napoléon Bourassa (29th)
1882: Honourable Louis Beaubien (30th)
1883: Jérémie Perrault (31st)
1884: Honourable Thomas Jean-Jacques Loranger (28th)
1885-86: Adolphe Ouimet (32nd)
1887: Dr. Emmanuel-Persillier Lachapelle (33rd)
1888-92: Honourable Laurent-Olivier David (34th)
1893-98: Honourable Louis-Onésime Loranger (35th)
1899-1904: Honourable François-Ligori Beique (36th)

20th century

First half 
1905: Joseph-Xavier Perrault (37th)     
1905-1907: Sir Hormidas Laporte (38th)
1908-1911: Joseph-Charles Beauchamp (39th)
1911-1913: Thomas Gauthier (40th)
1913-14: Olivar Asselin (41st)     
1914-15: Charles Duquette (42nd)
1915-1924: Me Victor Morin (43rd)
1924-25: Joseph-Victor Desaulniers (44th)
1925: Guy Vanier (45th)
1925: Léon Trépanier (46th)
1929: Guy Vanier (45th)
1930: Aimé Parent (47th)
1931: Victor-Elzéar Beaupré (48th)
1932: Ernest Brossard (49th)
1933: Victor Doré (50th)
1934: Joseph-Alfred Bernier (51st)
1935: Ernest Laforce (52nd)     
1937: Joseph Dansereau (53rd)     
1939: Louis-Athanase Fréchette (54th)
1943: Roger Duhamel (55th)
1945: Charles-Auguste Changnon (56th)
1946: Arthur Tremblay (57th)

Second half 
1950: Dr. J.-Alcide Martel (58th)
1951: J. Émile Boucher (59)
1954: François-Eugène Therrien (60th)
1957: Paul Guertin (61st)
1960: Jean Séguin (62nd)
1962: Paul-Émile Robert (63rd)
1965: Me Yvon Groulx (64th)
1968: Dollard Mathieu (65th)
1969: François-Albert Angers (66th)
1973: Me Yvon Groulx (64th)
1973: André Trudeau (67th)
1974: Yvan Sénécal (68th)
1975: Jean-Marie Cossette (69th)
1976: Jean-Charles Desroches (70th)
1977: André Beauchamp (71st)
1977: Jean-Paul Champagne (72nd)
1978: Jean-Marie Cossette (69th)
1980: Marcel Henry (73rd)
1981: Gilles Rhéaume (74th)
1985: Jean-Marie Cossette (69th)
1986: Nicole Boudreau (75th)
1989: Jean Dorion (76th)
1994: François Lemieux (77th)
1997: Guy Bouthillier (78th)

21st century 
2003: Jean Dorion (76th bis)
2009: Mario Beaulieu (79th)
2014: Maxime Laporte (80th)

See also 
Saint-Jean-Baptiste Society
Quebec nationalism
Quebec sovereignty movement

References
  Past Presidents (Anciens présidents) of the Saint-Jean-Baptiste Society

Presidents of the Saint-Jean-Baptiste Society of Montreal
 
Presidents of the Saint-Jean-Baptiste Society of Montreal, List of
Saint-Jean-Baptiste Society
Saint-Jean-Baptiste
Presidents of the SJBSM